Esentepe is a village in Dikili district of İzmir Province, Turkey. It is situated on the road connecting Dikili to Çandarlı. The population of Esentepe was  288 as of 2011  as of 2011.

References

Villages in Dikili District